Cheaters is a 2000 HBO television drama film that chronicles the story of the 1994–1995 Steinmetz High School team that cheated in the United States Academic Decathlon (USAD). It is based on a true story. The movie was filmed in Toronto and Chicago. It was nominated for the Primetime Emmy Award for Outstanding Writing for a Limited Series, Movie, or Dramatic Special.

Plot

Jolie Fitch is a junior at Steinmetz High School who enjoys Dr. Jerry Plecki's English class and is involved heavily in all discussions, especially on his favorite book Paradise Lost. Dr. Plecki is offered the position of Academic Decathlon coach, a job all the other teachers consider to be a waste of time for everyone involved. Dr. Plecki holds an open call for the students after class, but no one arrives to participate. He is about to leave for the day when Jolie comes in and convinces him that he needs to look for the smarter students and recruit them. He succeeds in recruiting seven students (Darius, Matt, Paul, Dominik, Irwin, Agnieszka, and Jolie). They spend the next few months studying hard for the regional competition.

At regionals, the team faces their biggest competitor in Whitney Young Magnet High School, who have consistently won the regional and state competitions for almost a decade. As expected, Whitney Young is victorious and Steinmetz places 5th overall, but still qualify for the state competition. The students are overwhelmed to be facing Whitney Young in the next round, but an opportunity arises when Matt receives a copy of the test for the state finals. Irwin then brings it to Dr. Plecki, who feels that using the test is the team's best chance to defeat Whitney Young at state.

After some persuasion, all seven members agree to dismiss their conflicting feelings about cheating and begin copying the answers on various items (calculators, shoes, a piece of gum, etc.). Dr. Plecki then tells Irwin privately that because he had the lowest scores in the group, he will be out of the state competition; however, he will be guaranteed a spot in nationals. Though Irwin is upset, he agrees to go along with it.

At the state finals, a much more confident Steinmetz meets Whitney Young again. The team successfully gets through the exams with the answers they secretly wrote down and with Jolie coaching them in the Super Quiz. At the end of the day, Steinmetz wins the state finals with an overall score of 49,000, raising the ire and suspicions of Whitney Young who resolve to investigate.

As Steinmetz celebrates their victory, a spiteful Irwin writes an essay, detailing how he feels betrayed by Dr. Plecki and how they received an advance copy of the test. Suspicions heighten when the essay is turned in to the principal, who questions Irwin about the truth of his writing. The Illinois Academic Decathlon board arrives at the school with news that the team will need to take a re-test to validate their scores. If they refuse, they will lose their championship. Feeling betrayed by Irwin and angered by the board's ultimatum, they refuse to cooperate and plan to seek an injunction to halt the state from re-testing them.

As the media siege escalates, Angela Lam, a student on the Academic Decathlon team from the year prior, talks to the press about how she was given the answers to the Super Quiz in the state competition by Dr. Plecki. She encourages the current team members to come clean if they cheated. Dr. Plecki is immediately suspended from his teaching duties and the team members are taken to the Board of Education headquarters where they are interrogated individually. Despite being pressured, they refuse to come clean and insist they did not cheat. However, Dominik ultimately breaks and confesses after a heart-to-heart talk with one of the investigators.

As a result, the state title is stripped from Steinmetz and awarded to Whitney Young. Dr. Plecki is fired from Steinmetz High School, and the team members are harassed by the other students for ruining their reputation. Dr. Plecki decides to leave Chicago in hopes the media will disperse and leave the team members alone. He meets with his team one last time by Lake Michigan in downtown Chicago, where the students present him with a gift: John Milton's book Paradise Lost signed by the team and the gold medal in Language and Literature that they didn't return to the board. With the team disbanded and Dr. Plecki gone, Jolie feels that she's lost a mentor that actually cared about her academic possibilities and her team that supported each other. In the end, Jolie gets accepted into college and recognizes the merit of her achievements without cheating.

In the epilogue, it is stated that Dominik, Agneiska, and Paul went off to college, Matt worked in a hardware store and was voted employee of the month, Darius' whereabouts are unknown, Irwin went to college to become a journalist, and Dr. Plecki started a business.

As a result of the 1995 cheating scandal, Steinmetz High School was banned from fielding an Academic Decathlon team for ten years. They returned to the competition in 2006.

Cast
Jeff Daniels as Dr. Gerard Plecki
Jena Malone as Jolie Fitch
Paul Sorvino as Constantine Kiamos
Luke Edwards as Darius Bettus
Blake Heron as Matt Kur
Dov Tiefenbach as Irwin Flickas

See also
 Starter for 10

References

External links

2000 films
2000s coming-of-age drama films
American coming-of-age drama films
Coming-of-age films based on actual events
United States Academic Decathlon
Films directed by John Stockwell
Films scored by Paul Haslinger
2000 drama films
Films about academic scandals
2000 television films
HBO Films films
American drama television films
2000s American films